Leuconostoc rapi  is a Gram-positive bacterium from the genus of Leuconostoc which has been isolated from a rutabaga in Finland.

References

 

Lactobacillaceae
Bacteria described in 2015